is the 5th show in the Ultra Series. Produced by Tsuburaya Productions, the series aired on Tokyo Broadcasting System from April 8, 1972, to March 30, 1973, with a total of 52 episodes.

Starting from this show, the Ultra Series begins to shift from a sci-fi/mystery adventure to superhero fantasy fare. All previous Ultramen (Ultraman, Ultraseven, Ultraman Jack, and Zoffy) make regular appearances in this series, whereas they only made guest appearances in the previous show The Return of Ultraman.

Plot
From another dimension, Yapool orchestrated attacks on Earth using biological weapons called  that surpassed ordinary monsters. The first Terrible-Monster Verokron managed to destroy a city and the  that was dispatched to fight it. A pair of youths, Seiji Hokuto and Yuko Minami, lost their lives in protecting nearby civilians as the fifth Ultra from M78, Ultraman Ace fused with them. Yapool, on the other hand, would send more Terrible-Monsters, including external help from various forces and occasionally went face-to-face with TAC and Ace themselves.

In the middle of the series, Yuko was revealed to be one of the last natives from the Moon and gave her Ultra Ring to Seiji, leaving Earth in episode 28. Seiji was on his own in succeeding episodes. In the final episode, Yapool masqueraded as the child of Alien Simon and combined several of his past Terrible-Monsters into Jumbo King. When Yapool allowed himself to be killed as the children lost their faith in Seiji, the latter exposed his identity to them and fought the chimeric monster, eventually triumphing over Jumbo King. With Yapool's first attempt (of what would become many) at taking over the Earth thwarted at last, Ace departed the Earth to return home.

Episodes

Cast
：
: 
: 
: 
: 
: 
: 
: 
: 
: 
: 
, : 
Narrator:

Songs
Opening theme

Lyrics: 
Composition & Arrangement: 
Artist: , 

Insert themes
 
Lyrics: Kyōichi Azuma
Composition & Arrangement: Tōru Fuyuki
Artist: Honey Knights, Misuzu Children's Choir

Lyrics: Kyōichi Azuma 
Composition & Arrangement: Tōru Fuyuki
Artist: Ace Mennen Call

Home media
In July 2019, Mill Creek Entertainment announced that it had acquired most of the Ultraman library from Tsuburaya Productions through Indigo Entertainment, including 1,100 TV episodes and 20 films. Mill Creek released the series on Blu-ray and digital on May 12, 2020, in standard and steelbook sets.

In July 2020, Shout! Factory announced to have struck a multi-year deal with Alliance Entertainment and Mill Creek, with the blessings of Tsuburaya and Indigo, that granted them the exclusive SVOD and AVOD digital rights to the Ultra series and films (1,100 TV episodes and 20 films) acquired by Mill Creek the previous year. Ultraman Ace, amongst other titles, will stream in the United States and Canada through Shout! Factory TV and Tokushoutsu.

References

External links

Official website of Tsuburaya Productions 
Ultraman Connection — Official website 
Official Ultraman channel at YouTube

1972 Japanese television series debuts
1973 Japanese television series endings
Ultra television series
Extraterrestrial superheroes
Television series about orphans
Fictional adoptees
1972 manga
TBS Television (Japan) original programming